The Roman Catholic Diocese of East Anglia is a diocese of the Latin Church of the Roman Catholic Church covering the counties of Cambridgeshire, Norfolk, Suffolk, and Peterborough in eastern England.  The diocese makes up part of the Catholic Association Pilgrimage.

Statistics
There are 85,309 members of the church, who belong to the 50 parishes in the diocese.  The patrons of the diocese are Our Lady of Walsingham (24 September), St Felix (8 March), and St Edmund (20 November).

Churches
The diocese is divided into seven deaneries, which are in turn divided into 50 parishes.  Note that the list below is not exhaustive, and includes only notable parishes.

Deanery of Bury St Edmunds (St Edmund)

Masses are also said at RAF Lakenheath, at Clare Priory, at the Monastery of Our Lady of Mount Carmel in Quidenham, at the care home of the Sisters of Our Lady of Grace and Compassion in Great Barton, and in the villages of Cavendish and Woolpit.

Deanery of Cambridge (St Andrew)

Masses are also said at RAF Alconbury, at Blackfriars, the Dominican Priory of St Michael, Cambridge, at Fisher House University Chaplaincy, and in the villages of Bar Hill and Papworth Everard.

Deanery of Great Yarmouth (St Peter)

1No longer listed on diocesan website.

Deanery of Ipswich (St Edward)
Aldeburgh with Leiston Parish
Our Lady & St Peter, Aldeburgh
St James, Ipswich
St Mark's Parish
St Mark, Ipswich
St Mary's Parish
St Mary, Ipswich
St Mary Magdalen, Ipswich
St Pancras, Ipswich
Woodbridge and Framlingham Parish
St Thomas of Canterbury, Woodbridge

Deanery of King's Lynn (St Wilfrid)
St Dominic, Downham Market
Basilica of Our Lady of Walsingham
Our Lady & St Charles Borromeo, Wisbech

Deanery of Norwich (St Felix)
Cathedral of St John the Baptist, Norwich

Deanery of Peterborough (St Hugh)
St Peter & All Souls, Peterborough
Ukrainian Catholic Church of St Olga, Peterborough

History
On , by the decree Quod Ecumenicum, Pope Paul VI formed the Diocese of East Anglia (from the counties of Cambridge, Norfolk and Suffolk) out of the Diocese of Northampton.

On 2 June 1976, the new diocese received its first bishop, Alan Clark. Bishop Clark had previously been auxiliary bishop of Northampton and co-chairman of ARCIC (Anglican/Roman Catholic International Commission), with the cathedral being established at the former parish church of St John the Baptist, Norwich. As the first bishop of the new diocese, Bishop Clark had to set up all the necessary instruments and commissions for the diocese to operate successfully. The establishment of the Diocesan Pastoral Council in 1987 strengthened these.

The diocese continued to grow with the development of the diocesan offices and diocesan tribunal attached to Bishop's House in Poringland near Norwich. Bishop Clark led a number of Lourdes pilgrimages.

Ordinaries

Alan Charles Clark (appointed on 26 April 1976 – retired on 21 March 1995) 
Peter David Smith (appointed on 21 March 1995 – translated to the Archdiocese of Cardiff on 26 October 2001) 
Michael Charles Evans (appointed on 14 February 2003 – died in office on 11 July 2011)
Alan Hopes (appointed on 11 June 2013 - resignation accepted on 11 October 2022)
Peter Collins (appointed on 11 October 2022 and installed on 14 December 2022)

Pilgrimage
The diocese makes up part of the Catholic Association Pilgrimage.

See also
 Buckden Towers
 Quidenham Hall
 Catholic Church in England and Wales
 List of Catholic churches in the United Kingdom

References

External links
Roman Catholic diocese of East Anglia — official website

 
Religion in Suffolk
Religion in Norfolk
Christianity in Cambridgeshire
Christian organizations established in 1976
Roman Catholic dioceses and prelatures established in the 20th century
1976 establishments in England
East Anglia